Carex ericetorum, known as rare spring sedge, is a perennial species of plants in the sedge family Cyperaceae native to central Europe and western Asia growing on calcareous soils in short grassland.

References

ericetorum
Flora of Europe
Flora of temperate Asia
Plants described in 1777